Xavier Gens (born on  in Dunkirk, France) is a French film director.

Filmography

Director
Lights Out (TBA)
Vanikoro (TBA)
Gangs of London (2020) Season 1 Episodes 6, 7 and 8
Budapest (2018)
Cold Skin (2017)
The Crucifixion (2017)
The ABCs of Death (2012) – short film ("X Is for XXL")
The Divide (2011)
Hitman (2007)
Frontier(s) (2007)
Sable noir (2006) – short film
Au petit matin (2005) – short film
Born to Kast (2000) – short film

Writer
Frontier(s) (2007)
Sable noir (2006)
Au petit matin (2005)
BTK – Born to Kast (2000)

Actor
La Horde (2009, voice only)
Lady Blood (2008)
Le bon, la brute et les zombies (2004)

Casting director
30 ans (2000)

Production manager
Les kidnappeurs (1998)
Le bossu (1997)

Production assistant
Cell (2016)
La Horde (2009)
Cramps (2000)
The Secret Laughter of Women (1999)
Madame Jacques sur la Croisette (1997)
Double Team (1997)
Maximum Risk (1996)
Never Ever (1996)

Hitman
A few weeks before the release of Hitman, reports came in that the studio, 20th Century Fox, had turned down the version of the film that Gens submitted to them. Nicolas de Toth was brought in to edit the movie for commercial purposes, and Fox ordered a number of reshoots. While Fox denied claims that Xavier Gens had been fired due to the extreme violence in his cut, and insisted that he was still on the project, some reports stated that Gens was not even in the country as these reshoots were being made. Hitman was a success with a gross of $92 million, Gens' most successful film.

La Horde
He narrated and produced the French zombie film La Horde, directed by Yannick Dahan and Benjamin Rocher. The film was released on 10 February 2010 and distributed by IFC Films.

The Divide
Gens directed The Divide (initially titled The Fallout), his second English-language film, which features Michael Biehn in the lead role.

References

External links

1975 births
Living people
French film directors
People from Dunkirk
French male film actors
Horror film directors